Arcan may refer to:

 Arcan (dance), Romanian dance (Ukrainian version: Arkan)
Arcan (surname)
 Arcan Cetin (1996–2017), American mass murderer
 Arçan, Azerbaijan

See also 
 
 Arkan (disambiguation)
 Arcane (disambiguation)